Rogemar "Ogie" A. Menor (born December 4, 1986 in Roxas, Isabela) is a Filipino professional basketball player who last played for the Bulacan Kuyas of the Maharlika Pilipinas Basketball League (MPBL).

High school
Menor spent high school at San Beda College in Mendiola, Manila where he was a vital cog for the Red Cubs in the NCAA Juniors Division. They swept the eliminations of the 79th season of the NCAA paving the way for a duel with the Mapua Robins for the 2003 Juniors basketball championship. The Red Cubs won and Menor was named the Finals MVP. During the 80th season which was his last in the NCAA Juniors, Menor was named the Season MVP and Finals MVP while beating the Letran Squires for the championship.

College
Menor figured in a controversy even before his first college game. He stayed at La Salle for a week before he had a change in heart and opted to return to San Beda College. There, he boldly promised to give the Red Lions the championship. In his first year, though, he struggled to adapt to the college game. Still, he was a threat to other teams. He lost the Rookie of the Year honors to Kelvin dela Peña. San Beda had high hopes of winning the championship after a 28-year drought during his second year. With Menor contributing consistently with averages of 8.6 points, 6 rebounds, and 1.9 assists in 14 games, he finally delivered on his promise as they won the NCAA championship against the PCU Dolphins. In his third year, the Red Lions faced the Letran Knights for the championship and Menor was named the Finals MVP. Menor scored a career high 35 points against the St. Benilde Blazers during his senior year. That was his last year in the Red Lion uniform as he opted to enter his name in the PBA after the season ended.

Career
Menor was drafted 7th overall by the Barako Bull Energy Boosters in the 2009 PBA draft. He was then traded to the now-defunct Sta. Lucia Realtors and later played for the Meralco Bolts. He was waived by the team during the 2011 PBA Commissioner's Cup. Due to injuries to key players Mark Cardona and Chris Ross, Menor was re-signed by the Bolts. He was later traded to the Powerade Tigers during the off-season along with Chris Timberlake. However, he was not signed. He was then signed by the Clickers before the start of the season. In 2014, Menor played for expansion team Blackwater Elite for the 2014–15 season. Menor gained widespread attention on his 'butiki' (lizard in English) haircut that it even reached global attention from several sports websites around the world like ESPN and Bleacher Report.

References

External links
PBA Online! Profile
Awards: Most Valuable Players
Primer: NCAA senior men's basketball

1986 births
Living people
Filipino men's basketball players
San Beda Red Lions basketball players
People from Isabela (province)
Basketball players from Isabela (province)
Shooting guards
Small forwards
Barako Bull Energy Boosters players
Sta. Lucia Realtors players
Meralco Bolts players
Air21 Express players
Blackwater Bossing players
Filipino expatriate basketball people in the United States
Maharlika Pilipinas Basketball League players
Filipino expatriate basketball people in Thailand
Ilocano people
Barako Bull Energy Boosters draft picks